The Pension Protection Fund (PPF) is a statutory corporation, set up by the Pensions Act 2004, and has been protecting members of eligible defined benefit (DB) pension schemes across the United Kingdom since 2005. It protects close to 10 million members belonging to more than 5,200 pension schemes across the UK. If an employer collapses and its DB pension scheme cannot pay members what they were promised, the PPF will pay compensation for their lost pensions. Despite being a public body, the PPF is not funded by the government or the taxpayers. It has four sources of funding including an annual levy charged to all the eligible pension schemes under its protection, income from its investments, assets from the schemes that transfer into the fund and recoveries, including money and other assets, from the insolvent employers of the schemes that transfer into the fund.

The PPF is one of the UK’s largest asset owners with £39 billion of assets under management. It also administers the Fraud Compensation Fund (FCF) the government’s Financial Assistance Scheme (FAS) and across both the PPF and FAS looks after nearly 440,000 members.  

The PPF is run by an independent Board and accountable to Parliament through the Secretary of State for the Department for Work and Pensions. Kate Jones has been the chair of the Board since 1 July 2021, and has been a non-executive board member since February 2016. Oliver Morley CBE has been the PPF’s chief executive since March 2018.

Eligible schemes
The PPF protects most occupational defined benefit pension schemes in the UK although it doesn’t protect public sector defined benefit pension schemes that are covered by a crown guarantee. [4]

All eligible schemes are required to pay an annual levy which contributes towards the administration of the fund and the compensation it pays to its members.

Scheme assessment
The PPF does not automatically take on the responsibility for a DB scheme as soon as their employer suffers an insolvency event. The scheme and its members will first enter an assessment period which usually lasts between 18 to 24 months. During this time, the PPF will carry out a series of tasks and activities to check that all the scheme data, including members’ details, is accurate so that members can receive the right benefits. Scheme trustees remain responsible for the day-to-day running of the scheme whilst it is in assessment including paying pensioners their benefits. 

Once the data is accurate, the PPF will then carry out a valuation of the scheme's assets and liabilities. If this valuation finds that the scheme can afford to purchase annuities for its members at or above the level of compensation the PPF would provide, then the scheme will exit the assessment period and wind up independently. If the scheme cannot afford to purchase such benefits for its members, the assets of the scheme will transfer into the PPF and the Board will take over responsibility for paying compensation to members.

Compensation
The PPF pays two levels of compensation which are set out in legislation:[6]
•	If members are over the normal pension age of the scheme, or are in receipt of a spouses, dependants or ill health pension they will receive 100 per cent of the pension in payment when the company entered insolvency. 
•	If a member is an early retiree or under the normal pension age of the scheme, they will receive 90 per cent of what they were.

In most cases, members’ compensation for pensionable service from 6 April 1997 will rise in line with inflation each year, subject to a maximum of 2.5 per cent a year. Member compensation will remain stable and not change if there are no inflationary increases or if there is a fall in inflation too. Compensation for pensionable service before 6 April 1997, including any applicable Guaranteed Minimum Pension (GMP) benefits, won’t increase in line with inflation. 

Following a court ruling in July 2021, the statutory limit on the amount of compensation paid by the PPF, known as the compensation cap, no longer applies.

Levies
One of the PPF’s four sources of funding is a levy charged to all eligible defined benefit schemes.

There are two parts to how the levy is calculated:
•	The scheme based levy – based on how large the scheme is and is payable by all schemes
•	The risk-based levy – take account of the scheme’s sponsoring employer’s insolvency risk, the scheme’s underfunding risk and its investment risk.

Similar to an insurance premium the amount each scheme pays is based on the risk it could present. To calculate this risk, the PPF will assess the risk of a scheme’s ability to meet its pension obligations, the scheme’s investment strategy, and the risk of a sponsoring employer(s) going insolvent.

The PPF’s insolvency risk partner assesses the likelihood of a scheme’s sponsoring employer becoming insolvent at the end of each month, and generates an insolvency risk score. The PPF will then take a 12-month average of these scores between April and March and place the scheme's sponsoring employer(s) in one of ten levy bands.
Each band has a different levy rate, band 1 is the strongest band – with the lowest levy rate – and band 10 is the weakest. The levy rate is used as part of the calculation when generating the schemes levy bill.

List of schemes
A list of all schemes which have been transferred into the Pension Protection Fund up to September 2015 can be seen on the PPF website.

See also
 Pension Benefit Guaranty Corporation – The equivalent body in the United States

References

External links

Association of Member-Directed Pension Schemes (AMPS) – The principal body for discussing changes involved in the area of pension planning.

Pensions in the United Kingdom
Department for Work and Pensions
Statutory corporations of the United Kingdom government
2005 establishments in the United Kingdom